Audea melaleuca is a species of moth in the family Erebidae. It is found in Cameroon, Cape Verde, Eritrea, Mauritania, Nigeria and South Africa.

References

Moths described in 1865
Audea
Moths of Africa
Moths of Cape Verde